Nystad may refer to:

Places
Nystad, Nordland, a village in Fauske, Nordland county, Norway
The town and municipality in Finland called Nystad (Swedish) or Uusikaupunki (Finnish)

People
Claudia Nystad, a German top-level female cross-country skier

Other
Treaty of Nystad, the last peace treaty of the Great Northern War